Frédéric Mawet (born 30 July 1977) is a Belgian badminton player. He won eight times national titles in the men's doubles event partnered with Wouter Claes. In 2008, he became a junior coach in Ligue Francophone Belge de Badminton (LFBB). As a coach, he also brought Yuhan and Lianne Tan to compete at the 2016 Rio Summer Olympics.

Achievements

BWF International Challenge/Series
Men's doubles

 BWF International Challenge tournament
 BWF International Series/European Circuit tournament

References

External links
 

Belgian male badminton players
1977 births
Living people